Heterotaxis is a genus of orchids native to Latin America from central Mexico to Bolivia, and also to parts of the West Indies. One species extends into Florida (H. sessilis, listed under synonym Maxillaria crassifolia in Flora of North America).

Heterotaxis brasiliensis (Brieger & Illg) F.Barros - Brazil
Heterotaxis discolor (Lodd. ex Lindl.) Ojeda & Carnevali - Belize, Nicaragua, Venezuela, the Guianas, Bolivia, Brazil, Bolivia, Peru, Ecuador 
Heterotaxis equitans (Schltr.) Ojeda & Carnevali - Venezuela, Suriname, Guyana, Bolivia, Brazil, Bolivia, Peru, Ecuador  
Heterotaxis fritzii Ojeda & Carnevali - Ecuador  
Heterotaxis maleolens (Schltr.) Ojeda & Carnevali - Chiapas, Central America
Heterotaxis microiridifolia (D.E.Benn. & Christenson) Ojeda & Carnevali - Peru
Heterotaxis santanae (Carnevali & I.Ramírez) Ojeda & Carnevali - Brazil, Ecuador, Venezuela
Heterotaxis schultesii Ojeda & G.A.Romero - Brazil, Colombia
Heterotaxis sessilis (Sw.) F.Barros - widespread from Veracruz and Florida south to Brazil
Heterotaxis superflua (Rchb.f.) F.Barros - Brazil, Venezuela, the Guianas, Bolivia, Ecuador, Peru 
Heterotaxis valenzuelana (A.Rich.) Ojeda & Carnevali  - Central America, Cuba, Venezuela, Colombia, Ecuador, Brazil 
Heterotaxis villosa (Barb.Rodr.) F.Barros - Brazil, Venezuela, the Guianas, Bolivia, Ecuador, Peru, Colombia
Heterotaxis violaceopunctata (Rchb.f.) F.Barros - Brazil, Venezuela, the Guianas, Ecuador, Peru, Colombia

References

External links 

Maxillariinae genera
Maxillariinae